Professional Footballers Association of Malaysia (abbrev: PFAM)
is a representative organisation for professional football players in Malaysia, established in 2014. It is affiliated with the worldwide professional football players organisation, FIFPro, since 22 October 2013. It was registered with the Malaysia Sports Commissioner's Office on 4 August 2014.

PFAM was inactive for a few years until it was reactivated in 2013, with Hairuddin Omar elected as president of the association.

For the 2021-2023 session, Safee Sali led the organization and was assisted by Razman Roslan as Vice President.

PFAM is vocal about welfares of football players in Malaysia, whether still active of retired. PFAM also is responsible for the PFAM Player of the Month award, given to the best player in Malaysia football monthly.

Objective 

PFA Malaysia was established to promote, advance and protect the interest of professional footballers in Malaysia. It exists to support and provide advice to, and represent professional footballers in Malaysia in matters pertaining to their relations with Football Association of Malaysia (FAM), clubs, state football associations or any other body responsible for or in any way connected with the administration of football in Malaysia.
 
PFA Malaysia also provides legal advice and assistance to professional footballers in Malaysia in respect of their professional contractual obligations with their clubs or state football associations, and PFA Malaysia acts as an exclusive representative body and collective bargaining agent of Malaysia's professional footballers.
 
PFA Malaysia also seeks to promote professional football as a stable, secure and worthwhile career, and provides advice and assistance to Malaysia's professional footballers in their career development.
 
With the support of FIFPRO, PFA Malaysia seeks to establish an international network to enable Malaysia's professional footballers to have an input in international decision-making in matters pertaining to the game of football.
 
PFA Malaysia exists to fight for the players, and build the beautiful game

PFAM-asiana.my Player of the Month Award 
In 2015, PFAM created an award to be given to player;
 PFAM Player of the Month

In 2016, they created another award;
 PFAM Player of the Month (Malaysia Premier League)

PFAM Executive

PFAM Committee 
For session 2021 - 2023

PFAM Social Media
As on 1st March 2023

See also
 Football Association of Malaysia

References 

Association football trade unions
Professional associations based in Malaysia
Football in Malaysia
Organizations established in 2009
2009 establishments in Malaysia